The Academy Award for Best Animated Feature is given each year for animated films. An animated feature is defined by the Academy as a film with a running time of more than 40 minutes in which characters' performances are created using a frame-by-frame technique, a significant number of the major characters are animated, and animation figures in no less than 75 percent of the running time. The Academy Award for Best Animated Feature was first awarded in 2002 for films released in 2001.

The entire AMPAS membership has been eligible to choose the winner since the award's inception. If there are sixteen or more films submitted for the category, the winner is voted from a shortlist of five films, which has happened nine times, otherwise there will only be three films on the shortlist.

History
For much of the Academy Awards' history, AMPAS was resistant to the idea of a regular award for animated features, considering there were simply too few produced to justify such consideration. Instead, the Academy occasionally bestowed special Oscars for exceptional productions, usually for Walt Disney Pictures, such as for Snow White and the Seven Dwarfs in 1938, and the Special Achievement Academy Award for the live action/animated hybrid Who Framed Roger Rabbit in 1989 and Toy Story in 1996. In fact, prior to the award's creation, only one animated film was nominated for Best Picture: 1991's Beauty and the Beast, also by Disney.

By 2001, the rise of sustained competitors to Disney in the feature animated film market, such as DreamWorks Animation (founded by former Disney executive Jeffrey Katzenberg), created an increase of film releases of significant annual number enough for AMPAS to reconsider. The Academy Award for Best Animated Feature was first given out at the 74th Academy Awards, held on March 24, 2002. The Academy included a rule that stated that the award would not be presented in a year in which fewer than eight eligible films opened in theaters. It dropped the rule on April 23, 2019, to make voting for animated films more acceptable. People in the animation industry, as well as fans, expressed hope that the prestige from this award and the resulting boost to the box office would encourage the increased production of animated features.

In 2009, when the nominee slots for Best Picture were doubled to ten, Up was nominated for both Animated Feature and Picture at the 82nd Academy Awards, the first to do so since the inception of the Animated Feature category. This feat was repeated the following year by Toy Story 3.

In 2022, it was unclear whether Marcel the Shell with Shoes On would be eligible for the award at the 95th Academy Awards due to being a live-action/stop-motion animated hybrid. Director Dean Fleischer Camp said that he and A24 had to submit documentation in order to prove the film had enough animation to meet the award's minimum requirements. Nonetheless, the AMPAS officially deemed the film eligible for consideration in the Animated Feature category.

Criticism and controversies

Best Picture criticism 
Some members and fans have criticized the award, however, saying it is only intended to prevent animated films from having a chance of winning Best Picture. DreamWorks had advertised heavily during the holiday 2001 season for Shrek, but was disappointed when the rumored Best Picture nomination did not materialize, though it was nominated for and ultimately won the inaugural Best Animated Feature award.

The criticism surrounding the Best Animated Feature category was particularly prominent at the 81st Academy Awards, in which WALL-E won the award but was not nominated for Best Picture, despite receiving widespread acclaim from critics and audiences alike and being generally considered to be one of the best films of 2008. This sparked controversy over whether the film was deliberately snubbed of such nomination by the Academy. Film critic Peter Travers commented that "if there was ever a time where an animated feature deserved to be nominated for Best Picture, it's WALL-E." However, official Academy Award regulations state that any film nominated for this category can still be nominated for Best Picture.

From 2010 onward, with the increasing competitiveness of the Animated Feature category, Pixar (a perennial nominee) did not receive nominations for several recent films due to the more mixed critical response and comparatively low box-office receipts, while Pixar's sister studio Disney Animation won their first three awards.

Eligibility of motion capture films 
In 2010, the Academy enacted a new rule regarding the motion capture technique employed in films such as A Christmas Carol (2009) and The Adventures of Tintin (2011), each directed by Academy Award for Best Director winners Robert Zemeckis and Steven Spielberg, and how they might not be eligible in this category in the future. This rule was possibly made to prevent nominations of live-action films that rely heavily on motion capture, such as Avatar (2009).

Remarks about animated films as children's genre 
At the 94th Academy Awards, the award for Best Animated Feature was presented by three actresses who portrayed as Disney princess characters in live-action remakes of their respective animated films: Lily James (Cinderella), Naomi Scott (Aladdin), and Halle Bailey (The Little Mermaid. While introducing the category, Bailey stated that animated films are "formative experiences as kids who watch them," as James put it, "So many kids watch these movies over and over, over and over again." Scott added: "I see some parents who know exactly what we're talking about." The remarks were heavily criticized by animation fans and those working in the animation industry as infantilizing the medium and perpetuating the stigma that animated works are strictly for children, especially since the industry was credited with sustaining the flow of Hollywood content and revenue during the height of the COVID-19 pandemic. Phil Lord, co-producer of one of the nominated films, The Mitchells vs. the Machines, tweeted that it was "super cool to position animation as something that kids watch and adults have to endure." The film's official social media accounts responded to the joke with an image reading: "Animation is cinema." A week later, Lord and his producing partner Christopher Miller wrote a guest column in Variety criticizing the Academy for the joke and how Hollywood has been treating animation writing that "no one set out to diminish animated films, but it's high time we set out to elevate them." They also suggested to the Academy that the category should be presented by a filmmaker who respects the art of animation as cinema.

Adding to the controversy was the fact that the award for Best Animated Short Film (the nominees for which were mostly made up of shorts not aimed at children) was one of the eight categories that were not presented during the live broadcast. The winner for the Best Animated Short award was The Windshield Wiper, a multilingual Spanish-American film which is adult animated, while another nominee in three categories: Best Animated Feature, Best Documentary Feature, and Best International Feature Film, was Flee, a PG-13 rated animated documentary about an Afghan refugee. Alberto Mielgo, director of The Windshield Wiper, later gave an acceptance speech for the Oscar: "Animation is an art that includes every single art that you can imagine. Animation for adults is a fact. It’s happening. Let’s call it cinema. I’m very honored because this is just the beginning of what we can do with animation." Some speculations suggested that the speech played a role in the decision to not broadcast the award.

Another factor is that numerous animated films have been made for mature audiences or with ranges of PG-13 or more, with a few of them —The Triplets of Belleville, Persepolis, Chico and Rita, The Wind Rises, Anomalisa, My Life as a Courgette, The Breadwinner, Loving Vincent, Isle of Dogs, I Lost My Body and Flee— having been nominated in this category, though none have won, 

These comments came as #NewDeal4Animation, a movement of animation workers demanding equal pay, treatment and recognition alongside their contemporaries working in live-action, was picking up momentum during negotiations for a new contract between The Animation Guild, IATSE Local 839/SAG-AFTRA and the Alliance of Motion Picture and Television Producers, and the presentation is being used to rally the movement.

Winners and nominees

2000s

2010s

2020s

Multiple wins
3 wins
 Pete Docter

2 wins
 Brad Bird
 Byron Howard
 Jonas Rivera 
 Clark Spencer
 Andrew Stanton
 Lee Unkrich

Multiple nominations

4 nominations
 Pete Docter

3 nominations
 Brad Bird 
 Ron Clements 
 Dean DeBlois
 Byron Howard
 Travis Knight 
 Hayao Miyazaki 
 Rich Moore
 Tomm Moore
 Chris Sanders 
 Clark Spencer
 Chris Williams

2 nominations
 Wes Anderson
 Bonnie Arnold
 Chris Buck
 Tim Burton
 Chris Butler
 Sylvain Chomet
 Don Hall
 John Lasseter
 Phil Lord
 Christopher Miller
 John Musker
 Yoshiaki Nishimura
 Jonas Rivera
 Osnat Shurer
 Andrew Stanton
 Arianne Sutner
 Toshio Suzuki
 Lee Unkrich
 Peter Del Vecho
 Paul Young

Franchises

Multiple wins
2 wins
Toy Story

Multiple nominations

4 nominations
Shrek

3 nominations
How to Train Your Dragon
Irish Folklore Trilogy
Wallace and Gromit

2 nominations
The Incredibles
Kung Fu Panda
Toy Story
Wreck-It Ralph

Studios with multiple nominations

Notes

Milestones

Studios and films 
 Pixar has the most wins with eleven and the most nominations of any studio with seventeen.
 They won the award in four consecutive years from 2007 to 2010.
 Laika has the most nominations without a win, with six films.
 Almost all the winners have been computer-animated; Spirited Away is the only Japanese, hand-drawn and non-English language animated film to win the category, and Wallace & Gromit: The Curse of the Were-Rabbit and Guillermo Del Toro’s Pinocchio are the only stop motion animated films to win.
 Toy Story is the only franchise with multiple wins due to its third and fourth films.
 Shrek (with one win) is the most-nominated franchise with four films.
 How to Train Your Dragon and Cartoon Saloon's "Irish Folklore Trilogy" (consisting of The Secret of Kells, Song of the Sea, and Wolfwalkers) are the most-nominated franchises or trilogy without a win.
 Of the eleven adult animated films nominated, eight of them —The Triplets of Belleville, Persepolis, The Wind Rises, Anomalisa, My Life as a Courgette, The Breadwinner, Loving Vincent, Isle of Dogs and Flee were each rated PG-13, Anomalisa is the only R-rated animated film to be nominated in this category, and Chico and Rita and I Lost My Body were not rated by the MPAA. No adult animated films has yet won.
 There have been years when multiple animated films from the same studio were nominated. They are: 
 2002 – Disney's Lilo & Stitch and Treasure Planet 
 2004 – DreamWorks' Shrek 2 and Shark Tale
 2011 – DreamWorks' Kung Fu Panda 2 and Puss in Boots
 2016 – Disney's Zootopia and Moana
 2020 – Pixar's Onward and Soul
 2021 – Disney's Raya and the Last Dragon and Encanto
 2022 – Netflix's The Sea Beast and Guillermo del Toro's Pinocchio
 Up and Toy Story 3 are the first two films to have won both Best Animated Feature and to have received Best Picture nominations. Their nominations after the Academy expanded the potential number of nominees for Best Picture from five to ten.
 Shrek is the only non-Disney/Pixar animated film to be nominated for a screenwriting category, Best Adapted Screenplay, while winning the inaugural Best Animated Feature category.
 As of 2023, Shrek and WALL-E are the only winners that are inducted in the National Film Registry.
 Studio Ghibli (Japan) and Aardman (UK) have the most wins for a non-US studio with one win each.
 Studio Ghibli has the most nominations for a non-US studio with six films (winning one with Spirited Away).
 Flee has the most nominations (3) for both an adult animated and documentary film, and was the first film to be nominated in the categories of Best Animated Feature, Best International Feature Film and Best Documentary Feature simultaneously.
 Two motion capture-related computer-animated films were nominated before a rule change in 2010 disqualified such films: Monster House and Happy Feet (the latter won the award).

People 
 In 2013, Brenda Chapman was the first woman to win.
 In 2019, Peter Ramsey was the first African-American to win.
 In 2023, Guillermo del Toro was the first filmmaker, as well as the first Latin, to win both Best Director/Best Picture and Best Animated Feature at different films, for his work of The Shape of Water and Pinocchio.
 Pete Docter has the most wins and nominations of any individual, winning three awards for Up, Inside Out and Soul. His first nomination was for Monsters, Inc.
 Dean DeBlois (Canada) has the most nominations for a non-US individual with three films.
 Hayao Miyazaki (Japan), Nick Park & Steve Box (both UK), George Miller (Australia), and Yvett Merino & Guillermo del Toro (both Mexico) have the most wins for non-US individuals with one film each.
 Ron Clements, Dean DeBlois, Travis Knight, Tomm Moore, and Chris Sanders are tied for receiving the most nominations without winning, with three each.

See also
 List of animation awards
 Lists of animated feature films
 List of animated feature films nominated for Academy Awards
 List of submissions for the Academy Award for Best Animated Feature
 List of animated feature films awards
 Academy Award for Best Animated Short Film
 Golden Globe Award for Best Animated Feature Film
 Annie Award for Best Animated Feature
 Annie Award for Best Animated Feature — Independent
 Producers Guild of America Award for Best Animated Motion Picture
 Detroit Film Critics Society Award for Best Animated Feature
 BAFTA Award for Best Animated Film
 Critics' Choice Movie Award for Best Animated Feature
 Los Angeles Film Critics Association Award for Best Animated Film
 Saturn Award for Best Animated Film
 Japan Media Arts Festival
 Animation Kobe
 Tokyo Anime Award

References

External links
 Academy Awards Database – AMPAS
 Academy Award WInning Feature Films at Big Cartoon Database
 Best Animated Picture Submissions for 2011 Oscars

Animated Feature
Awards for best animated feature film
American animation awards
Awards established in 2001
History of animation